The National Gendarmerie is one of two national law enforcement forces of France, along with the National Police. The Gendarmerie is a branch of the French Armed Forces placed under the jurisdiction of the Ministry of the Interior, with additional duties from the Ministry of Armed Forces. Its responsibilities include policing smaller towns, suburbs and rural areas, along with special subdivisions like the GSPR. By contrast, the National Police is a civilian law enforcement agency that is in charge of policing cities and larger towns. Because of its military status, the Gendarmerie also fulfills a range of military and defence missions, including having a cybercrime division. The Gendarmerie has a strength of around 102,269 people (as of 2018).

The Gendarmerie has influenced the culture and traditions of gendarmerie forces around the world, especially in independent countries from the former French colonial empire.

History

Early history of the institution

The Gendarmerie is the direct descendant of the Maréchaussée ("Marshalcy") of the ancien regime. The  lasted from medieval times until the French Revolution.

During the Middle Ages, there were two Grand Officers of the Kingdom of France with police responsibilities: The Marshal of France and the Constable of France. The military policing responsibilities of the Marshal of France were delegated to the Marshal's provost, whose force was known as the Marshalcy because its authority ultimately derived from the Marshal. The Marshalcy dates back to the Hundred Years' War, with some historians tracing it back to the early 12th century.

The second organisation, the Constabulary, was under the command of the Constable of France. The constabulary was regularised as a military body in 1337.

In 1415 the  fought in the Battle of Agincourt and their commander, the Prévôt des Maréchaux (Provost of the Marshals), Gallois de Fougières, was killed in battle. This history was rediscovered in 1934, and Gallois de Fougières was then officially recorded as the first known gendarme to have died in the line of duty. His remains are now buried under the monument to the gendarmerie in Versailles.

Unlike the former constabulary, the new  was not a fully militarized force.

On the eve of the 1789 French Revolution, the Maréchaussée numbered 3,660 men divided into small brigades (a "brigade" in this context being a squad of ten to twenty men). Their limited numbers and scattered deployment rendered the  ineffective in controlling the "Great Fear" of July through August, 1789.

The Revolutionary Period

During the revolutionary period, the  commanders generally placed themselves under the local constitutional authorities. Despite their connection with the king, they were therefore perceived as a force favoring the reforms of the French National Assembly.

Its personnel remained unchanged, and the functions of the force remained much as before. During the revolutionary period, the main force responsible for policing was the National Guard. Although the  had been the main police force of the ancien regime, the gendarmerie was initially a full-time auxiliary to the National Guard militia.

In 1791 the newly named  was grouped into 28 divisions, each commanded by a colonel responsible for three départements. In turn, two companies of gendarmes under the command of captains were based in each department. This territorial basis of organisation continued throughout the 19th and 20th centuries.

Nineteenth century

Under Napoléon, the numbers and responsibilities of the gendarmerie—renamed —were expanded significantly. In contrast to the mounted , the gendarmerie were both horse and foot personnel; in 1800, these numbered approximately 10,500 of the former and 4,500 of the later, respectively.

Subsequently, special gendarmerie units were created within the Imperial Guard for combat duties in French occupied Spain.

Following the Second Restoration of 1815, the gendarmerie was reduced in numbers to about 18,000 and reorganised into departmental legions. Under King Louis Phillippe a "gendarmerie of Africa" was created for service in Algeria and during the Second Empire the Imperial Guard Gendarmerie Regiment was re-established. The majority of gendarmes continued in what was now the established role of the corps—serving in small, sedentary detachments as armed rural police. Under the Third Republic the ratio of foot to mounted gendarmes increased and the numbers directly incorporated in the French Army with a military police role reduced.

Battle honours

Five battles are remembered on the flag of the Gendarmerie:
 Battle of Hondschoote (1793): Four hundred gendarmes of the 32nd Division (equivalent of a regiment under the Revolution) engaged in battle on the left wing of the army. They seized enemy artillery positions and lost 117 men.
 Villodrigo (1812): The 1st legion of Gendarmerie on horseback, belonging to the Brigade of Cavalry of the Army of the North, clashed with the British cavalry on 23 October 1812. Charging with sabres, they penetrated enemy lines killing 250 and taking 85 prisoners. Colonel Béteille, commanding the brigade, received twelve sabre cuts, but he survived.
 Taguin (1843): Thirty gendarmes on horseback were mobilised to take part in tracking the tribe of the emir Abd-El-Kader and participated in his capture. In a painting by Horace Vernet, which immortalises the scene and hangs in the Musée de Versailles, the gendarmes appear alongside the Algerian Governor-General, Henri d'Orléans, duc d'Aumale.
 Sevastopol (1855): Two infantry battalions of the Regiment of Gendarmerie of the Imperial Guard participated in taking the city. The 1st battalion seized a strategic position that contributed towards the final victory. A total of 153 Gendarmes fell during this siege.
 Indo-China (1945/1954): Three legions of infantrymen from the Republican Guard (3000 men) were formed at the end of 1946. Charged with the formation of the Cochin China Civil Guard, they assumed security roles and patrolled the borders, suffering heavy losses: 680 were killed or went missing and 1,500 were wounded.

The gendarmes are also occasionally called , which is a slang term derived from an 18th-century Hungarian word for "frontier guards." The symbol of the gendarmerie is a stylized grenade, which is also worn by the Italian Carabinieri and the Grenadier Guards in Britain. The budget in 2008 was approximately 7.7 billion euros.

The equivalent Dutch force, Royal Marechaussee, uses officially the old French term--which King William I, when assuming power after the fall of Napoleon, considered preferable to "gendarmerie".

Missions

In French, the term "police" not only refers to the forces, but also to the general concept of "maintenance of law and order" (policing). The Gendarmerie's missions spans three categories:
 Administrative police, upholding public order, safety checks and traffic controls, assistance to people in imminent danger, protection duties, etc.
 Judicial police, handling penal law enforcement and investigation of crimes and felonies
 Military and defense missions, including military police for the armed forces

These missions include:

 The policing of the countryside, rivers, coastal areas, and small towns with populations under 20,000, that are outside of the jurisdiction of the French National Police. The Gendarmerie's area of responsibility represents approx. 95% of the French territory and 50% of the population of France
 Criminal investigations under the supervision of the judiciary
 Maintaining law and order in public gatherings and demonstrations, including crowd control and other security activities
 Police at sea 
 Security of airports, civil nuclear sites and military installations 
 Provision of military police services to the French military—on French territory as well as during foreign operations (OPEX)
 For the Republican Guard (Garde républicaine—which is part of the Gendarmerie), participation in the state's protocol and ceremonies

Organization

Basic principles

The Gendarmerie, while remaining part of the French armed forces, has been attached to the Ministry of the Interior since 2009. Criminal investigations are run under the supervision of prosecutors or investigating magistrates. Gendarmerie members generally operate in uniform, and, only occasionally, in plainclothes.

Director-General
The Director-general of the Gendarmerie (DGGN) is appointed by the Council of Ministers, with the rank of Général d'Armée. The current Director-General is Général Christian Rodriguez who took office on November 1, 2019.

The Director-General organizes the operation of the Gendarmerie at two levels:
 At the operational level. The DGGN is in charge of plans, operations, procurement, training and support of the forces in the field.
 In an advisory position for government in all matters pertaining to the Gendarmerie.

Directorate-General
The Gendarmerie headquarters, called the Directorate-General of the National Gendarmerie ( (DGGN))), long located in downtown Paris, relocated in 2012 to the southern suburb of Issy-les-Moulineaux.

The Directorate-General of the national gendarmerie includes:
 The general staff, divided into offices and services,
 The inspector-general of the Gendarmerie (I.G.G.N.)
 Three main directorates 
 Human Resource directorate (D.P.M.G.N.)
 Finance and Support directorate (D.S.F.) 
 Operations directorate (D.O.E.)—The general, chief of the Operations directorate, has authority on:
 Organisation and evaluation subdirectorate,
 International co-operation subdirectorate,
 Defence and public order subdirectorate,
 Public safety and road traffic safety subdirectorate,
 Criminal Investigation subdirectorate.
Two joint Gendarmerie/Police offices
 Joint Information systems office (ST(SI)2)
 Joint purchasing office (SAELSI)

Organization
The main components of the organization are Departmental Gendarmerie, Mobile Gendarmerie, Republican Guard, Overseas Gendarmerie, five specialized Gendarmerie branches, Provost Gendarmerie and Intervention Group of the National Gendarmerie.
The above-mentioned organizations report directly to the Director General (DGGN) with the exception of the Republican Guard, which reports to the Île-de-France region.

Departmental Gendarmerie

The Departmental Gendarmerie, also named «La Blanche» (The White), is the most numerous part of the Gendarmerie, is in charge of policing small towns and rural areas. Its territorial divisions are based on the administrative divisions of France, particularly the departments from which the Departmental Gendarmerie derives its name. The Departmental Gendarmerie carries out the general public order duties in municipalities with a population of up to 20,000 citizens. When that limit is exceeded, the jurisdiction over the municipality is turned over to the National Police.

It is divided into 13 metropolitan regions (including Corsica), themselves divided into  (one for each of the 100 , thus the name), themselves divided into  (one for each of the 342 arrondissements).

It maintains gendarmerie brigades throughout the rural parts of the territory. There are two kind of brigades:
 Large autonomous territorial brigades (BTAs)
 Brigade groups composed of smaller brigades supervised by a larger one (COBs).
In addition, it has specialised units:
 Research units, who conduct criminal investigations when their difficulty exceeds the abilities of the territorial units
 Surveillance and intervention platoons (PSIGs), who conduct roving patrols and reinforce local units as needed.
 Specialized brigades for prevention of juvenile delinquency
 Highway patrol units.
 Mountain units, specialised in surveillance and search and rescue operations, as well as inquiries in mountainous areas

In addition, the Gendarmerie runs a national criminal police institute specializing in supporting local units for difficult investigations.

The research units may be called into action by the judiciary even within cities (i.e. in the National Police's area of responsibility). As an example, the Paris research section of the Gendarmerie was in charge of the investigations into the vote-rigging allegations in the 5th district of Paris (see corruption scandals in the Paris region).

Gendarmes normally operate in uniform. They may operate in plainclothes only for specific missions and with their supervisors' authorisation.

Mobile Gendarmerie 

The Mobile Gendarmerie, also named « La Jaune » (The Yellow), it is organized in seven Regions of the Mobile Gendarmerie (one for each of the seven military regions of metropolitan France, called. It comprises 18 Groupings featuring 109 squadrons for a total of approx. 11,300 personnel.

Its main responsibilities are:
 crowd and riot control
 general security in support of the Departmental Gendarmerie
 military and defense missions 
 missions that require large amounts of personnel (Vigipirate counter-terrorism patrols, searches in the countryside...)

Nearly 20% of the Mobile Gendarmerie squadrons are permanently deployed on a rotational basis in the French overseas territories. Other units deploy occasionally abroad alongside French troops engaged in military operations (called external operations or OPEX).

Easy ways to distinguish them include:
 the uniform of the CRS is dark blue, the mobile gendarmerie are clad in black jackets and dark blue trousers;
 the CRS wear a big red CRS patch; the gendarmes have stylised grenades.
 the helmet of the mobile gendarmerie is blue. The CRS helmet is black with two yellow stripes

The Mobile Gendarmerie includes GBGM, an Armoured grouping composed of seven squadrons equipped with VXB armoured personnel carriers, better known in the Gendarmerie as VBRG ("Gendarmerie armoured wheeled vehicle"). It is based at Versailles-Satory. The unit also specializes in CBRN defense.

Republican Guard

The Republican Guard is a ceremonial unit based in Paris. Their missions include:

 It provides protection and ceremonial guard for the President of The Republic, the Prime Minister, their official residencies and both chambers of the French Parliament. 
 Guarding important public buildings in Paris such as the Élysée Palace, Hôtel Matignon, the Senate, the National Assembly, the Hall of Justice, and keeping public order in Paris.
 Honour and security services for the highest national personalities and important foreign guests;
 Support of other law enforcement forces (with intervention groups, or horseback patrols);
 Staffing horseback patrol stations, particularly for the forests of the Île-de-France region

Overseas Gendarmerie

The non-metropolitan branches include units serving in the French overseas  and territories (such as the Gendarmerie of Saint-Pierre and Miquelon), staff at the disposal of independent States for technical co-operation, Germany, security guards in French embassies and consulates abroad.

Five specialized Gendarmerie branches

Air Gendarmerie

The Air Gendarmerie is placed under the dual supervision of the Gendarmerie and the Air Force, it fulfills police and security missions in the air bases, and goes on the site of an accident involving military aircraft.

Maritime Gendarmerie

Placed under the dual supervision of the Gendarmerie and the Navy, its missions include:

 police and security in the naval bases;
 maritime surveillance;
 police at sea;
 assistance and rescue at sea.

Air Transport Gendarmerie

The Air Transport Gendarmerie is placed under the dual supervision of the Gendarmerie and the direction of civilian aviation of the transportation ministry, its missions include:

 police and security in civilian airfields and airports;
 filtering access to aircraft, counter-terrorism and counter-narcotic activities, freight surveillance;
 surveillance of technical installations of the airports (control tower...);
 traffic control on the roads within the airports;
 protection of important visitors;
 judiciary inquiries pertaining to accidents of civilian aircraft.

Ordnance Gendarmerie
The Ordnance Gendarmerie fulfills police and security missions in the establishments of the Délégation Générale pour l'Armement (France's defence procurement agency).

Nuclear ordnance security Gendarmerie

The Nuclear ordnance security Gendarmerie (GSAN) was created in 1964. It is directly subordinated to the Ministry of Armed Forces and plays a major role in the security chain of the nuclear devices.

The main mission of this specific branch is to secure the government's control over all the nuclear forces and weapons. The security of the civil nuclear powerplants and research establishments is provided by specialized units of the Departmental Gendarmerie. More specifically, the gendarmes of this unit are responsible for ensuring the protection and the readiness of the different kinds of missiles used by the French Navy and Air Force.

In order to do so, the GSAN is composed of his own units and of units from other branches of the gendarmerie, temporary placed under its command like squadrons of the Mobile Gendarmerie to protect the convoys of nuclear weapons components. For instance, a special security platoon can be deployed on board of the French aircraft carrier Charles de Gaulle to secure the nuclear weapons carried on the ship.

Provost Gendarmerie
The Provost Gendarmerie, created in 2013, is the military police of the French Army deployed outside metropolitan France. The functions of military police for the French Army on French soil are fulfilled by units of the Departmental Gendarmerie.

National Gendarmerie Intervention Group 

GIGN is one of the two premier Counter-terror formations of France. Its counterpart within the National Police is the RAID. Operatives from both formations make up the protective detail of the French President (the GSPR). Its missions include counter-terrorism, hostage rescue, surveillance of national threats, protection of government officials and targeting of organized crime.

GIGN was established in 1974 following the Munich massacre. Created initially as a relatively small police tactical unit specialized in sensitive hostage situations, it has since grown into a larger and more diversified force of nearly 400 members.

Many of its missions are classified, and members are not allowed to be publicly photographed. Since its formation, GIGN has been involved in over 1,800 missions and rescued more than 600 hostages, making it one of the most experienced counter-terrorism units in the world. The unit came into prominence following its successful assault on a hijacked Air France flight at Marseille Marignane airport in December 1994.

Foreign service

Gendarmerie units have served in:

 Syria
 Lebanon
 Algeria
 Kosovo (within MSU)
 Rwanda
 Ivory Coast
 Bosnia-Herzegovina
 Haiti
 Central Africa
  North Macedonia
 Afghanistan

Uniforms

The uniform of the Gendarmerie has undergone many changes since the establishment of the corps. Throughout most of the 19th century a wide bicorne was worn with a dark blue coat or tunic. Trousers were light blue. White aiguillettes were a distinguishing feature. In 1905 the bicorne was replaced by a dark blue kepi with white braiding, which had increasingly been worn as a service headdress. A silver crested helmet with plume, modelled on that of the French cuirassiers, was adopted as a parade headdress until 1914. Following World War I a relatively simple uniform was adopted for the Gendarmerie, although traditional features such as the multiple-cord aiguillette and the dark blue/light blue colour combination were retained.

Since 2006 a more casual "relaxed uniform" has been authorised for ordinary duties (see photograph below). The kepi however continues in use for dress occasions. Special items of clothing and equipment are issued for the various functions required of the Gendarmerie. The cavalry and infantry of the Republican Guard retain historic ceremonial uniforms dating from the 19th century.

Gallery

Ranks

Personnel
As of 31 December 2018, the National Gendarmerie consisted of approx. 98,000 personnel units. Career gendarmes are either commissioned or non-commissioned officers. The lower ranks consist of auxiliary gendarmes on limited-time/term contracts. The 102,269 personnel of the National Gendarmerie is divided into:

 6,203 officers and 74,105 NCOs of gendarmerie;
 595 officers and 4,592 NCOs of the technical and administrative body;
 12,602 section volunteers, from voluntary gendarmes (AGIV) and voluntary assistant gendarmes (GAV);
 4,424 civilian personnel are divided into civil servants, state workers and contracted workers;
 66,425 reserve personnel. This reserve force had not yet reached the authorised size limit. Only 25,000 men and women were signed up for reserve engagements (E.S.R.).

This personnel mans the following units:

 Départemental Gendarmerie
 1,055 Community brigades;
 697 autonomous brigades ;
 370 Surveillance and Intervention Platoons (PSIG);
 271 Dog-handling Teams;
 17 Mountain Platoons;
 92 Departmental Brigades for Investigations and Judicial Services;
 383 Research sections and brigades;
 14 Air Sections;
 7 River Brigades;
 26 Coastal brigades;
 93 departmental squadrons for roadway security;
 136 Highway Platoons;
 37 brigades for the prevention of juvenile delinquency;
 21 Centers for Information and Recruitment.

 Gendarmerie Mobile 
 108 squadrons
 6 Special Security Platoons.

 Special formations
 5 squadrons and 10 companies of Republican Guard;
 40 brigades of gendarmerie for air transports and research sections (BGTA);
 8 Protection Units;
 19 Air sections and detachments;
 18 gendarmerie armament units.

 Other units
 3 673 personnel overseas posts;
 74 brigades and postes of the maritime gendarmerie;
 54 brigades of Air Gendarmerie;
 23 schools and Instruction Centers.

Prospective Centre
The Gendarmerie nationale's Prospective Centre (CPGN), which was created in 1998 by an ordinance of the Minister for Defence, is one of the gendarmerie's answers to officials' willingness to modernise the State. Under the direct authority of the general director of the gendarmerie, it is located in Penthièvre barracks on Avenue Delcassé in Paris and managed by Mr Frédéric LENICA, (assisted by a general secretary, Colonel LAPPRAND) "maître des requêtes" in the Conseil d'Etat.

Equipment

Cars
The gendarmerie uses many different French cars, like Renault Megane and Peugeot Partner.

Helicopters
The Gendarmerie has used helicopters since 1954. They are part of the Gendarmerie air forces ( or FAG—not to be confused with the Air Gendarmerie or the Air Transport Gendarmerie). FAG units are attached to each of the seven domestic "zonal" regions and six overseas COMGEND (Gendarmerie commands). They also operate for the benefit of the National Police which owns no helicopters (the Police also has access to Civil Security helicopters).

, Gendarmerie air forces (FAG) operate a fleet of 56 machines belonging to three types and specialized in two basic missions: surveillance/intervention and rescue/intervention.

Eurocopter AS350 Écureuil: 26 machines (surveillance/intervention)
Eurocopter EC135: 15 machines (surveillance/intervention)
Eurocopter EC-145: 15 machines (rescue/intervention)

Gallery

Weapons 
The Gendarmerie use as service pistol the Sig-Sauer SP 2022 - like almost all French law enforcement agencies. 

Also in common use are:  

 The Heckler & Koch MP5 and Heckler & Koch UMP9
 The Glock 26 for the "Section de recherches" of the Departemental Gendarmerie (Detectives) 
 The FAMAS
 The Heckler & Koch G36 in version G36K
 The  PAMAS G1 automatic pistol, in use by reserve officers. 

This list is completed by less-lethal weapons like the LBD-40 (a 40mm plastic ball launcher), the Taser x26 and Pepper Spray.

See also 

 Air France Flight 8969
 Airborne Units of the National Gendarmerie
 Law enforcement in France
 Le Gendarme de Saint-Tropez—cult comedy series
 GendBuntu—the version of the Ubuntu open source operating system developed by the Gendarmerie for their own use
 National Gendarmerie Museum

 General
 Police
 Gendarmerie
 International Association of Gendarmeries and Police Forces with Military Status

Notes

References

Citations

Sources

External links

 Gendarmerie nationale official site at the French MoI 

National law enforcement agencies of France
France
 
1791 establishments in France
! 04
France
Military units and formations established in 1791